This is a list of sources of light, the visible part of the electromagnetic spectrum. Light sources produce photons from another energy source, such as heat, chemical reactions, or conversion of mass or a different frequency of electromagnetic energy, and include light bulbs and stars like the Sun. Reflectors (such as the moon, cat's eyes, and mirrors) do not actually produce the light that comes from them.

Incandescence
Incandescence is the emission of light from a hot body as a result of its temperature.

Combustion

Lamps

 (obsolete)

 (error)

s
s
 (obsolete)
s

Other

 
s

Nuclear and high-energy particle

Celestial and atmospheric

Astronomical objects
Sun (sunlight, solar radiation) 
 
 
Star (Starlight)
Nova / supernova / hypernova
 
 
 
 
 
 
 
 
 
 
Meteor 
 
 
 
Lightning (Plasma)

Luminescence

Luminescence is emission of light by a substance not resulting from heat.

Bioluminescence

Bioluminescence is light resulting from biochemical reaction by a living organism.

Cavitation bubbles made by mantis shrimps

Cathodoluminescence

Cathodoluminescence is light resulting from a luminescent material being struck by electrons.

Chemiluminescence    

Chemiluminescence is light resulting from a chemical reaction.

Cryoluminescence

Cryoluminescence is the emission of light when an object is cooled.

Crystalloluminescence

Crystalloluminescence is light produced during crystallization.

Electric discharge (electrical energy)

 (Obsolete)
 (Obsolete)

Electrochemiluminescence

Electrochemiluminescence is light resulting from an electrochemical reaction.

Electroluminescence

Electroluminescence is light resulting from an electric current being passed through a substance.

  
 
 
 
 
 
 
 
  Long distance beam light

Mechanoluminescence

Mechanoluminescence is light resulting from a mechanical action on a solid.

Triboluminescence, light generated when bonds in a material are broken when that material is scratched, crushed, or rubbed
Fractoluminescence, light generated when bonds in certain crystals are broken by fractures
Piezoluminescence, light produced by the action of pressure on certain solids
Sonoluminescence, light resulting from imploding bubbles in a liquid when excited by sound

Photoluminescence

Photoluminescence is  light resulting from absorption of photons.

Fluorescence, the emission of light by a substance that has absorbed light or other electromagnetic radiation
Phosphorescence, the delayed re-emission of light by substance that has absorbed it

Radioluminescence

Radioluminescence is light resulting from bombardment by ionizing radiation.

Thermoluminescence

Thermoluminescence is light from the re-emission of absorbed energy when a substance is heated.

See also 
 List of reflected light sources
 Luminous efficacy
 Photometry (optics)

References

External links 

 A CD spectrometer Color spectrographs of common light sources

Technology-related lists
Electronics lists